Tia Jackson (born April 21, 1972) is a former professional basketball player and a current assistant coach for Duke Blue Devils women's basketball team.

Coaching career
Jackson was hired as an assistant coach for the Duke Women's Basketball program in July 2020. Jackson, who both played and coached in an NCAA Final Four, is a 24-year coaching veteran with four years of head coaching experience. Jackson makes Durham, N.C., home for a second time as she spent the 2005–06 and 2006–07 seasons at Duke as an assistant coach, helping the Blue Devils to 63 victories and a trip to the 2006 NCAA championship game.

Jackson was hired as an assistant coach for the University of Miami women's basketball program on May 7, 2015. The Hurricanes eclipsed 20 wins and reached the NCAA Tournament in four of Jackson's five seasons with the team, including advancing to the Round of 32 on their home court twice (2017 and 2019). Miami held a 109–53 record during Jackson's tenure as an assistant coach for the Canes.

Prior to her time in Miami, Jackson spent four seasons as an assistant under Hall of Fame coach C. Vivian Stringer at Rutgers University.

College
Jackson graduated in 1995. She spent five seasons at University of Iowa and helped lead the Hawkeyes to four top-25 rankings.

WNBA
Following her assistant coaching tenure at Virginia Commonwealth University, she was drafted by the Phoenix Mercury and played one season, 1997. She played with Nancy Lieberman, was coached by Cheryl Miller, played a total of 26 games, and helped lead the team to the Western Conference Championship. She was unable to continue her career due to injury.

Personal life
Jackson earned a bachelor's degree in media studies and film.

References

External links
Tia Jackson WNBA Stats | Basketball-Reference.com
SCARLETKNIGHTS.COM Tia Jackson Bio - Official Athletic Site Official Athletic Site - Women's Basketball
Tia Jackson Named @MiamiWBB Assistant Coach - University of Miami Hurricanes Official Athletic Site

1972 births
Living people
American women's basketball coaches
Basketball coaches from Maryland
Basketball players from Maryland
Duke Blue Devils women's basketball coaches
Forwards (basketball)
Iowa Hawkeyes women's basketball players
Miami Hurricanes women's basketball coaches
People from Salisbury, Maryland
Phoenix Mercury draft picks
Phoenix Mercury players
Rutgers Scarlet Knights women's basketball coaches
Stanford Cardinal women's basketball coaches
UCLA Bruins women's basketball coaches
Washington Huskies women's basketball coaches